Genoese may refer to:

 a person from Genoa
 Genoese dialect, a dialect of the Ligurian language
 Republic of Genoa (–1805), a former state in Liguria

See also

 Genovese, a surname
 Genovesi, a surname
 
 
 
 
 Genova (disambiguation)
 Genoa (disambiguation)

Language and nationality disambiguation pages